Saud is an Arabic origin word which is used as a masculine given name and a surname. People with the name include:

Given name 
 Saud (actor), a Pakistani actor
 Saud Alam, Indian politician
 Saud Alhogbani (born 2003), Saudi Arabian tennis player
 Saud Alsanousi (born 1981), Kuwaiti writer and journalist
 Saud Al-Basher, Saudi Arabian karateka
 Saud al-Dosari (1968–2015), Saudi television presenter
 Saud Habib (born 1979), Kuwaiti sport shooter
 Saud Hamood (born 1989), Saudi football player
 Saud Kariri (born 1980), Saudi Arabian football player
 Saud Majeed, Pakistani politician
 Saud Memon (c. 1961–2007), Pakistani businessman
 Saud bin Rashid Al Mualla (born 1952),  ruler of the Emirate of Umm Al Quwain 
 Saud Al-Muwaizri (born 1969), Kuwaiti boxer
 Saud Al-Nasr (born 1998), Qatari football player
 Saud al-Qahtani (born 1978), Saudi consultant 
 Saud Qamar (born 1980), Kuwaiti cricketer
 Saud bin Saqr Al Qasimi (born 1956), ruler of the Emirate of Ras Al Khaimah
 Saud bin Abdulaziz Al Rashid (1898 – 1920), Emir of Jabal Shammar
 Saud Nasser Al-Saud Al-Sabah (1944–2012), Kuwaiti politician and diplomat
 Saud of Saudi Arabia (1902–1969), the second King of Saudi Arabia 
 Saud Al Kabeer bin Abdulaziz Al Saud (1882–1959), Saudi royal
 Saud bin Abdullah Al Saud (1946–2020), Saudi royal
 Saud bin Abdul Muhsin Al Saud (born 1947), Saudi royal 
 Saud bin Fahd Al Saud (born 1950), Saudi royal
 Saud bin Faisal Al Saud (1833–1875), ruler of second Saudi state
 Saud bin Faisal Al Saud (1940–2015), Saudi royal
 Saud bin Khalid Al Saud, Saudi royal
 Saud ibn Muhammad ibn Muqrin (1640–1726), eponymous ancestor of the House of Saud
 Saud bin Nayef Al Saud (born 1956), Saudi royal
 Saud bin Salman Al Saud (born 1986), Saudi royal
 Saud Shakeel (born 1995), Pakistani cricketer
 Saud Al Thani (disambiguation), multiple people from Al Thani family of Qatar
 Saud Zidan (born 1999), Saudi Arabian football player

Surname 
 Badrul Anam Saud, Bangladeshi film director and scriptwriter
 Javeria Saud, Pakistani actress
 Narayan Prakash Saud, Nepalese politician 
 Nar Bahadur Saud, Nepalese writer

Arabic masculine given names